La Tierra del Fuego is the second album by American jazz trumpeter Roy Campbell, recorded in 1993 and released on the Delmark label.

Music
The album reflects Roy's interest in World music. "I wanted more of a Latin and Third World sound than I had on New Kingdom" says Campbell. The title cut is a suite in three sections dedicate to the innovative musicians of the '60s, John Coltrane, Sun Ra, Cecil Taylor, Eric Dolphy, among others. On the tune "Booker's Lament" Roy pays homage to trumpeter Booker Little. Campbell had been playing trumpet by six years before he first heard Little perform on Max Roach's Deeds, Not Words. "He had textures, colors and voicings that were revolutionary for the '60s" says Campbell, citing Little's Out Front as a seminal trumpet recording.

Reception

Alex Henderson, in his review for AllMusic claims "In Spanish, La Tierra del Fuego means The Land of Fire, and Campbell brings plenty of fire and passion to this consistently inspired CD." The Penguin Guide to Jazz states that "is an intermittenly exciting stew of traditions and new ideas, with nods to Booker Little and various threads of Afro-Cuban jazz and the hottest modal bands of the 1960s."

Track listing
All compositions by Roy Campbell except as indicated
 "Jahne's Waltz" - 5:49
 "Booker's Lament" - 8:35 
 "Straight On Up Straight On Down"- 6:14 
 "Charmaine" - 8:42 
 "La Tierra del Fuego Suite" - 17:18 
 "Losaida" - 10:04 
 "The Sermon" (Ricardo Strobert) - 5:25

Personnel
Roy Campbell - trumpet, flugelhorn
Zane Massey - tenor sax 
Ricardo Strobert - alto sax, flute 
Rahn Burton - piano 
Hideji Tannaka - bass
Reggie Nicholson - drums
Talik Abdullah - percussion 
Klaas Hekman - bass sax on 2 & 6
Alex Lodico - trombone on 5 & 6

References

Delmark Records albums
Roy Campbell Jr. albums
1994 albums